Atractus paisa is a species of snake in the family Colubridae. The species can be found in Colombia.

References 

Atractus
Endemic fauna of Colombia
Reptiles of Colombia
Reptiles described in 2009